Dejal is a company that develops software for Mac OS X. Established by developer David Sinclair in 1991 in Auckland, New Zealand and since relocated to Portland, Oregon, the company develops and distributes a variety of shareware and freeware applications. Dejal has also released a number of open source projects to be used by other Mac developers in their software.

Dejal's first products were for Apple's System 7; today, the company's products are developed exclusively for Mac OS X. Older software for Mac OS 9 and earlier are still available as freeware, but are no longer supported.

In 2002, Dejal released version 1.0 of Simon, a server monitoring tool. Simon can perform a variety of tests, such as pinging a server or checking the content of a web page for changes, at user-specified intervals, and report on the results of the tests. Version 2.1 of the software was rated 3.5 out of 5 by Macworld, which praised the software's extensive notification and report options. The current version is 4.0.3.

In 2006, Dejal released version 1.0 of Caboodle, which is designed to collect and organize small pieces of information, which may be simply text (such as a shopping list or a snippet of code) or more complex items, such as images and internet links. Macworld rated version 1.3.1 of the software 2.5 out of 5, noting in its review that the software was built on a "superb concept" while being somewhat difficult to use and prone to bugs. The current version is 1.5.

Current products 

 Simon
 BlogAssist
 Caboodle
 Time Out (freeware)

Discontinued products 

 Macfilink
 FinderFront
 QuickEncrypt
 SndConverter
 SndCataloguer

References

External links 

 Dejal
 Developer page on MacUpdate

Software companies of New Zealand
Software companies based in Oregon
Companies based in Portland, Oregon
Software companies of the United States
Software companies established in 1991
1991 establishments in New Zealand